-up  is a suffix commonly found in place names in south western Western Australia. 
 
The suffix originated in a dialect of Noongar, an Australian Aboriginal language, in which "-up" means "place of".  The suffix "-in" or "-ing" has a similar meaning in a related dialect of Noongar. Places tended to be named after their distinctive features, whereby the place names could be used to create a "mental map" allowing Indigenous Australians to determine where water, food and other raw materials could be found. These sites were often located near sources of fresh water, leading to the common misconception that "up" and "in" mean "near water".

The meanings and the pronunciations of many of these names has been lost over time.

A number of these places were at one stage named with a suffix "-upp". This was as a result of the Western Australian Lands and Surveys Department adopting a system of spelling Indigenous Australian names devised by the Royal Geographical Society. In simple terms, the system set the pronunciation of consonants as in English and vowels as in Italian. Using this system meant that "up" would be pronounced  , whereas the names were meant to be pronounced  . The solution was deemed to be that doubling the following consonant would shorten the preceding vowel, thus "upp". This spelling convention was rescinded for towns in south west Western Australia in 1915 as the Australian pronunciation of "u" was almost always short.

The usage of some terms are for the name of Noongar groups as well as places Pinjarup is one of a number of names for one group – and it has been utilised and changed to the place name of Pinjarra.

List of places
The following is a list of locations in Western Australia which end in "-up".

See also
 Noongar for a map of the Noongar linguistic regions

Notes

Further reading
 Milne, Rod. (1992) Ups and ings : Aboriginal place names of south western W.A Perth, W.A.: R. Milne

External links
 http://www.slwa.wa.gov.au/find/guides/wa_history/place_names  State Library of Western Australia guide to researching Western Australian place names

Towns in Western Australia
Noongar placenames
Place name element etymologies
Indigenous toponymy
Australian toponymy
English suffixes